Portrait of a Young Woman is a  1510 oil on canvas painting, usually attributed to Rosso Fiorentino, though Giovanni Larciani (Master of the Kress Landscapes) has also recently been suggested as its artist. It is now in the Uffizi in Florence. It is usually thought to be an early work by Rosso, produced before the frescos of the Chiostrino dei Voti at Santissima Annunziata, Florence, though its sharp style makes it hard to give a definite attribution to Rosso.

Bibliography (in Italian)
Gloria Fossi, Uffizi, Giunti, Firenze 2004. 
Antonio Natali, Rosso Fiorentino, Silvana Editore, Milano 2006. 
 Elisabetta Marchetti Letta, Pontormo, Rosso Fiorentino, Scala, Firenze 1994.

References

Paintings in the collection of the Uffizi
Portraits of women
Young Woman
1510 paintings